The Canada men's national soccer team have played at the FIFA World Cup on two occasions, in 1986 & in 2022 and will be playing in 2026. For most other editions of the World Cup, Canada has not succeeded in gaining one of the places reserved for the North American CONCACAF teams. In 2022, Canada qualified for the World Cup for only the second time in history, ending a 36-year drought. Canada has also been qualified for the 2026 FIFA World Cup as hosts.

Overall record

1986 FIFA World Cup

Group C

2022 FIFA World Cup

Group stage

Top goalscorers

References

 
Countries at the FIFA World Cup
World